The 1972–73 Iowa State Cyclones men's basketball team represented Iowa State University during the 1972–73 NCAA Division I men's basketball season. The Cyclones were coached by Maury John, who was in his second season with the Cyclones. They played their home games at Hilton Coliseum in Ames, Iowa.

They finished the season 16–10, 7–7 in Big Eight play to finish in fifth place.

Roster

Schedule and results 

|-
!colspan=6 style=""|Regular Season

|-

References 

Iowa State Cyclones men's basketball seasons
Iowa State
Iowa State Cyc
Iowa State Cyc